Everyday is the fourth studio album by Dave Matthews Band, released on February 27, 2001.

Critical reception

Initial critical response to Everyday was generally mixed to positive. At Metacritic, which assigns a normalized rating out of 100 to reviews from mainstream critics, the album has received an average score of 67, based on 16 reviews.

Commercial performance
In the United States, Everyday performed very well commercially. The album debuted at #1 with 732,720 copies sold during its first week, and stayed at #1 for two weeks. After 25 weeks of sales, it sold over 2.5 million copies. To date, it has sold nearly 3 million copies. It was the 5th best selling album of the Billboard year in 2001. The album was also certified platinum in Canada (100,000 units) in July 2001.

Track listing
All songs by David J. Matthews and Glen Ballard.

Promotion
The album was promoted on the band's Everyday Tour.

"When the World Ends" was planned as a single, but scrapped after the events of September 11, 2001.  The more uplifting "Everyday" was eventually released in its place. Paul Oakenfold's remix of "When the World Ends" appeared as the closing track on the first disc of The Matrix Reloaded: The Album.

Personnel
Dave Matthews Band
Carter Beauford – bongos, conga, drums, background vocals, vibraphone
Stefan Lessard – bass guitar
Dave Matthews – acoustic guitar, electric guitar, vocals, baritone guitar
LeRoi Moore – flute, contrabass clarinet, alto saxophone, tenor saxophone, background vocals
Boyd Tinsley – violin, background vocals

Additional personnel
Glen Ballard – keyboards, piano
Carlos Santana – electric guitar on "Mother Father"
Karl Perrazo – percussion on "Mother Father"
Vusi Mahlasela – background vocals on "Everyday"

Technical
Glen Ballard – producer
Karl Derfler – recording engineer, digital editing
Scott Campbell – digital editing, additional engineering
John Nelson – assistant engineer
Chris Lord-Alge – mixing engineer
Matt Silva – mixing assistant
Bob Ludwig – mastering engineer
Jolie Levine-Aller – production coordinator
Rachel Cleverley – production assistant
Thane Kerner – art direction, design
Catherine Dee – design assistant
Danny Clinch – cover photography
Dan Winters – interior photography

Charts

Weekly charts

Year-end charts

Decade-end charts

Certifications

References

2001 albums
Dave Matthews Band albums
RCA Records albums
Albums produced by Glen Ballard